Line 10 of the Hangzhou Metro is a metro line in Hangzhou. Yisheng Road to Cuibai Road section of the line was opened on 21 February 2022. The one-station extension to Xueyuan Road was opened on 24 June 2022. The section from Xueyuan Road to Huanglong Sports Center was opened on 22 September 2022.

Opening timeline

Stations
Legend
 - Operational
 - Under construction

See also
 Hangzhou Metro

References

10
Railway lines opened in 2022
2022 establishments in China
Standard gauge railways in China